The Timothy J. Lynch House is a historic house at 416 N. 4th Avenue in Maywood, Illinois. The house, a large Chicago bungalow, was built in 1927. While thousands of bungalows were built in the Chicago area in the 1920s, including many others in Maywood, the Lynch House is unusual both for its size and its level of ornamentation. The house's design includes a main entrance with arched sidelights, round arched windows in a large front bay, patterned stained glass panels, and a green tile roof. Like many Chicago bungalows, the design features several elements of Prairie School architecture, such as the geometric designs in its stained glass windows, overhanging eaves, and wood trim on every door and window.

The house was added to the National Register of Historic Places on February 24, 1992.

References

Houses on the National Register of Historic Places in Cook County, Illinois
Bungalow architecture in Illinois
Houses completed in 1927
Maywood, Illinois